Ust-Vayenga is a rural locality (a settlement) and the administrative center of Ust-Vayengskoye Rural Settlement of Vinogradovsky District, Arkhangelsk Oblast, Russia. The population was 964 as of 2010. There are 15 streets.

Geography 
Ust-Vayenga is located 22 km north of Bereznik (the district's administrative centre) by road.

References 

Rural localities in Vinogradovsky District